The 1992 Northern Illinois Huskies football team represented Northern Illinois University as an independent during the 1992 NCAA Division I-A football season. Led by second-year head coach Charlie Sadler, the Huskies compiled a record of 5–6. Northern Illinois played home games at Huskie Stadium in DeKalb, Illinois.

Schedule

References

Northern Illinois
Northern Illinois Huskies football seasons
Northern Illinois Huskies football